Jesse H. Hoffmeister (June 1872 - January 14, 1933 in Des Moines, Iowa) was a Major League Baseball player who played infielder in . He would play for the Pittsburgh Pirates.

External links

1872 births
1933 deaths
Major League Baseball third basemen
Pittsburgh Pirates players
19th-century baseball players
Baseball players from Ohio
Reading Actives players
Allentown Kelly's Killers players
Toledo Mud Hens players
Youngstown Puddlers players
Springfield Governors players
Indianapolis Hoosiers (minor league) players
Cedar Rapids Bunnies players
Kansas City Blues (baseball) players
St. Paul Apostles players
St. Paul Saints (Western League) players
Terre Haute Hottentots players
New Orleans Pelicans (baseball) players
Atlanta Firemen players
Chattanooga Lookouts players
Minneapolis Millers (baseball) players
Crookston Crooks players
Butte Miners players
Butte Fruit Pickers players
Ottumwa Snappers players
Waterloo Microbes players
Oskaloosa Quakers players
Ottumwa Champs players